Water treaders, the superfamily Mesovelioidea, are insects in the order Hemiptera, the true bugs. They are semiaquatic insects that live in moist and wet habitat and on wet plant matter in several types of aquatic habitat.

These insects are no more than 3.5 mm long. They have elongated heads, long antennae, and large eyes, with the exception of Cryptovelia species, which have vestigial eyes. Females are larger than the males of their species and have well-developed ovipositors.

The type genus, Mesovelia, contains about 27 species, many of which are common and widespread. The other genera are small or even monotypic, and are less common.

One species is known for its unique specific name, Cavaticovelia aaa, sometimes called the aaa water treader. It is a legitimate binomial name following the International Code of Zoological Nomenclature, featuring aaa, the Hawaiian word for "lava tube".

According to some treatments, two families are in the Mesovelioidea. In others, the family Madeoveliidae is treated as a subfamily of the Mesoveliidae.

The two families, separated, with included genera are:

 Madeoveliidae
 Madeovelia Poisson, 1959	 
 Mesoveloidea Hungerford, 1929
 Mesoveliidae – water treaders, pondweed bugs
 Austrovelia
 Cavaticovelia
 Cryptovelia Andersen & Polhemus, 1980
 Darwinivelia Andersen & Polhemus, 1980
 Mesovelia Mulsant and Rey, 1852
 Mniovelia Andersen & Polhemus, 1980
 Nereivelia
 Phrynovelia Horváth, 1915
 Seychellovelia Andersen & Polhemus, 2003
 Speovelia Esaki, 1929

References